The 1000 metres distance for women in the 2008–09 ISU Speed Skating World Cup was contested over 10 races on seven occasions, out of a total of nine World Cup occasions for the season, with the first occasion taking place in Berlin, Germany, on 7–9 November 2008, and the final occasion taking place in Salt Lake City, United States, on 6–7 March 2009.

Christine Nesbitt of Canada won the cup, while fellow Canadian Kristina Groves came second, and Laurine van Riessen of the Netherlands came third.

Defending champion Anni Friesinger of Germany was injured in bicycle accident in the summer of 2008, leading to an operation to her right knee. Having recovered, she made a strong return to the World Cup towards the end of the season, and finished in eighth place after winning the last two races.

Top three

Race medallists

Finals standings
Standings as of 7 March 2009 (end of the season).

References

Women 1000
ISU